Kwok Ching Man (born 7 June 1993) is a Hongkonger footballer who plays as a defender for Hong Kong Women League club Citizen AA and the Hong Kong women's national team.

International career
Kwok Ching Man represented Hong Kong at two AFC Women's Olympic Qualifying Tournament editions (2016 and 2020), the 2017 EAFF E-1 Football Championship, the 2018 AFC Women's Asian Cup qualification and the 2018 Asian Games.

See also
List of Hong Kong women's international footballers

References

1993 births
Living people
Hong Kong women's footballers
Women's association football defenders
Hong Kong women's international footballers